Talencieux is a commune in the Ardèche department in southern France.

See also
Communes of the Ardèche department

References

External links

 Official site

Communes of Ardèche
Ardèche communes articles needing translation from French Wikipedia